Karin Maria Elisabet Johannesson (born 8 December 1970) is a Swedish prelate who is the current Bishop of Uppsala.

Biography
Johannesson was born in Filipstad, Värmland County, Sweden on 8 December 1970 and was educated at the public school in Filipstad. She graduated with a Bachelor of Theology in 1994, and a bachelor's degree in 1996 from Uppsala University. She earned her PhD in theology and obtained a doctorate there in 2002. She was ordained priest in 2010 in the Diocese of Karlstad by Bishop Esbjörn Hagberg. Johannesson was accepted as an associate professor of religious philosophy at Uppsala University in 2015. On 3 March 2019 she was consecrated as Bishop of Uppsala by Antje Jackelén, Archbishop of Uppsala and Primate.

References

Living people
1970 births
Swedish Lutheran bishops
21st-century Lutheran bishops
Women Lutheran bishops
People from Filipstad
Uppsala University alumni